Psammogeaya arenata is a species of harvestmen in a monotypic genus in the family Sclerosomatidae from Uruguay.

References

Harvestmen
Harvestman genera
Monotypic arachnid genera